Dhanendra Bahadur Singh was a Nepalese judge who served as 7th Chief Justice of Nepal, in office from 11 December 1985 to 7 August 1991. He was appointed by the then-king of Nepal, Birendra.

Singh was preceded by Nayan Bahadur Khatri and succeeded by Bishwonath Upadhyaya.

References 

Chief justices of Nepal